Anemone coronaria, the poppy anemone, Spanish marigold, or windflower, is a species of flowering plant in the buttercup family Ranunculaceae, native to the Mediterranean region.

Description

The flowers which bloom from April to June are borne singly on a tall stem with a whorl of small leaves just below the flower; the flower is 3–8 cm in diameter, with 5–8 red (but may be white or blue) showy petal-like tepals and a black centre. The pollen is dry, has an unsculpted exine, is less than 40 nm in diameter, and is usually deposited within 1.5 m of its source. This central mound consists of tightly packed pistils in the centre, with a crown-like ring of stamens surrounding this, giving the species its specific epithet coronaria. The flowers produce 200–300 seeds. The plants form hard black tubers as storage organs.

Aside from its flowers resembling poppies, the red single wild form flowers resemble the flowers of the red single wild form of Ranunculus asiaticus.

Taxonomy
Within the genus Anemone, A. coronaria is placed within subgenus Anemone, section Anemone, subsection Anemone and is one of five species making up series Anemone, together with A. hortensis L., A. palmata L., A. pavonina Lam. and A. somaliensis Hepper. Within the series A. coronaria is sister to A. somaliensis. This series is a clade of Mediterranean tuberous anemones. It is also the type species for the subgenus.

Etymology
Anemone coronaria means crown anemone, referring to the central crown of the flower, evoking regal associations. The Arabic name is shaqa'iq An-Nu'man translated literally as the wounds, or "pieces", of Nu'man.  One possible source of the name traces back to the Sumerian god of food and vegetation, Tammuz, whose Phoenician epithet was "Nea'man".  Tammuz is generally considered to have been drawn into the Greek pantheon as Adonis, who died of his wounds while hunting wild boar.  The deity is transformed into a flower, stained by the blood of Adonis. Tammuz's Phoenician epithet "Nea'man" is believed to be both the source of "an-Nu'man" in Arabic which came through Syriac, and of "anemone" which came through Greek. Another possible source of the name is An-Nu'man III Bin Al-Munthir, the last Lakhmid king of Al-Hirah (582-c.609 AD) and a Christian Arab. An-Nu'man is known to have protected the flowers during his reign. According to myth, the flower thrived on An-Nu'man's grave, paralleling the death and rebirth of Adonis.

In Hebrew, the anemone is kalanit metzuya. "Kalanit" comes from the Hebrew word "kala כלה" which means "bride", "metzuya" means "common." The kalanit earned its name because of its beauty and majesty, evoking a bride on her wedding day. In 2013 Anemone coronaria was elected as the national flower of the State of Israel, in a poll arranged by the Society for the Protection of Nature in Israel (החברה להגנת הטבע) and Ynet. Each year in Israel there is a month-long festival to celebrate the blooming of the red anemones. During the British Mandate for Palestine, British paratroopers were nicknamed "kalaniyot" for their red berets.

Distribution and habitat

Mediterranean littoral, from Greece, Albania, southern Turkey and Syria to the Sinai Peninsula with sporadic extension east to Iran and west along the Mediterranean shores of Italy, southern France and North Africa.

Ecology

In the wild, A. coronaria is winter flowering and cross pollinated by bees, flies and beetles, which can carry pollen over long distances.

Cultivation

Anemone coronaria was introduced into England prior to 1596, being described in Thomas Johnson's edition of John Gerard's Herball, first published in 1597 and was popular during the time of Queen Elizabeth I. By the beginning of the eighteenth century, breeders in France and Italy had already considerably improved the range of colours available.

Anemone coronaria is widely grown for its decorative flowers, and has a hardiness of USDA zones 7–10, preferring full sun to part shade. Although perennial in its native climate, A. coronaria is usually grown as an annual in cooler climates, from tubers. Planting is usually in the autumn if kept in pots in a greenhouse through the winter or in the ground in spring once the risk of frost has passed.

Cultivars

Modern cultivars have very large flowers, with diameters of 8–10 cm and a wide range of bright and pastel colours, in addition to two toned varieties. The centre is usually black, but may be pale green in white varieties. Stems may be as tall as 40–50 cm, and each plant may produce 13–15 blooms.

Numerous cultivars have been selected and named, the most popular including the De Caen (single) and St Brigid (semi-double and double) groups of cultivars. The De Caen group are hybrids cultivated in the districts of Caen and Bayeux in France in the 18th century, and include 'Bicolor' (red with white), 'Blue Poppy' (blue), 'Mr Fokker' (purple), 'Sylphide' (deep pink) and 'The Bride' (white). Referred to as poppy anemones because they closely resemble the true poppy (Papaveroideae). St. Brigid cultivars originated in Ireland, and named after that county's saint, they include 'Lord Lieutenant' (purple blue) and 'The Governor' (red). In addition to these large groups, there are two minor groups, Rissoana which is very rustic and early blooming (November) and Grassensis with large double flowers that bloom in the spring.

Gallery

See also
Wildlife in Israel

References

Bibliography

External links
 Comprehensive profile for Anemone coronaria, MaltaWildPlants.com
Anemonia coronaria in israelwildflowers.co.il
Photos of Anemone coronaria on Flickr
Anemone coronaria in Israel on Flickr

coronaria
Flora of Southeastern Europe
Flora of Southwestern Europe
Flora of Western Asia
Flora of North Africa
Plants described in 1753
Taxa named by Carl Linnaeus
National symbols of Israel